Clocks and watches with a 24-hour analog dial have an hour hand that makes one complete revolution, 360°, in a day (24 hours per revolution). The more familiar 12-hour analog dial has an hour hand that makes two complete revolutions in a day (12 hours per revolution).

Twenty-four-hour analog clocks and watches are used today by logistics workers, fire fighters, police officers, paramedics, nurses, pilots, scientists, and the military, and are sometimes preferred because of the unambiguous representation of a whole day at a time. Note that this definition refers to the use of a complete circular dial to represent a 24-hour day.  Using the numbers from 0 to 23 (or 1 to 24) to mark the day is the 24-hour clock system.

Sundials use 24-hour analog dials—the shadow traces a path that repeats approximately once per day.
Many sundials are marked with the double-XII or double-12 system, in which the numbers I to XII (or 1 to 12) are used twice, once for the morning hours, and once for the afternoon and evening hours. So VI (or 6) appears twice on many dials, once near sunrise and once near sunset.

Modern 24-hour analog dials—other than sundials—are almost always marked with 24 numbers or hour marks around the edge, using the 24-hour clock system.  These dials do not need to indicate AM or PM.

History
The ancient Egyptians divided the day into 24 hours. There are diagrams of circles divided into 24 sections in the astronomical ceiling in the tomb of Senemut.

Sundials use some or all of the 24-hour dial, because they show the position of the sun in the sky. Sometimes, for aesthetic rather than practical reasons, all the 24 hour marks are shown.

Medieval clocks often used the 24-hour analog dial, influenced by the widespread example of the astrolabe. In Northern Europe, the double-XII system was preferred: two sets of the Roman numerals I to XII were used, one on the left side for the night and morning hours, and another set on the right side of the dial to represent the afternoon and evening hours. In Italy, the numbers from 1 to 24 (I to XXIV in Roman numerals) were used, leading to the widespread use of the 24-hour system in that country. On Italian clocks, though, the I was often shown at the right side of the dial, rather than the top. This probably reflects the influence of the Italian timekeeping system, which started counting the hours of the day at sunset or twilight.
In northern Europe, the double XII system was gradually superseded during the 14th and 15th centuries by the single XII (12-hour system), leading to the widespread adoption of the 12-hour dial for popular use. The 24-hour analog dial continued to be used, but primarily by technicians, astronomers, scientists, and clockmakers. John Harrison, Thomas Tompion, and Mudge built a number of clocks with 24-hour analog dials, particularly when building astronomical and nautical instruments. 24-hour dials were also used on sidereal clocks.

The famous Big Ben clock in London has a 24-hour dial as part of the mechanism, although it is not visible from the outside.

In the 20th century, the 24-hour analog dial was adopted by radio amateurs, pilots, submariners, and for military use.

Today
24-hour analog watches and clocks are still being manufactured today, and are sought after by collectors and enthusiasts.  Manufacturers who make 24-hour analog watches include Glycine, Raketa, Vostok, Fortis, Poljot, Swatch, and many others.

Design

The major variation in the design of 24-hour analog dials is the location of midnight and noon. Although always opposite each other, 180° apart, noon is sometimes at the top, sometimes at the bottom. A few rare variants place noon and midnight at the right and left sides. There is no ambiguity if the 24-hour numbering is used.

In the United States, the government and military commonly use 24-hour clocks having noon at the bottom; the variant with noon at the top is far less common.

Watches

A 24-hour watch is a type of watch with an hour hand that completes a revolution every 24 hours.

The face may be arranged in either of two ways: with noon at the top and midnight at the bottom (similar to how one might observe the passage of the Sun over their time zone whilst facing south), or else rotated 180° with midnight at the top and noon at the bottom (as pictured).

Multiple time zones can be displayed by having multiple hour hands or a rotating bezel. The bezel is a ring around the outside of the watch's face.  When it is used, the top of the watch always represents midnight (or noon) GMT. The bezel, which also has hour markings, is then rotated so that its numbering represents local time. So, a pilot always has GMT time available for talking to air traffic control and, when they land, only has to rotate the bezel to "set" the watch to their new local time. Glycine was the first to feature a 24-hour rotating bezel in 1953 with the Airman No.1 Pilot watch. The design became widely known when Rolex designed the Rolex GMT Master for Pan-Am Pilots in 1954.

A 24-hour watch with a compass card dial can be used to determine direction when set to local noon and used in conjunction with the sun.

Many (but not all) digital watches can be set to show the time in 24-hour format.

Notable 24-hour watch brands

Akerfalk (Swedish)
Gallet (Swiss)
Glycine (Swiss)
Oris /(Swiss)
Poljot (Russian)
Raketa (USSR  Russian)
Rolex (Swiss)
Seiko (Japan)
Forté (USA)
Slow watch (Swiss)

World time

A common use for the 24-hour analog method of representing time is for showing the way the time of day depends on one's location. A globe, map, or disk can be used.

In fiction
George Orwell uses the 12-hour and 24-hour dials to symbolize the old and new worlds in his novel Nineteen Eighty-Four. The 12-hour dial is a relic of pre-revolutionary society, used to represent the desirable past; the 24-hour dial and time system is the compulsory standard imposed by the Party, and represents both conformity and the undesirable nature of the new world. This theme is famously set in the opening line:

It was a bright cold day in April, and the clocks were striking thirteen.

In the 1927 film Metropolis, the opening scene shows both a 24-hour analog clock and a 10-hour (decimal) analog clock, one above the other. Both are used to convey the impression of an alien and highly efficient society.

In Jules Verne's science fiction masterpiece 20,000 Leagues Under the Sea, Captain Nemo remarks that the clocks in the Nautilus use a 24-hour dial: "Now, look at that clock: it's electric, it runs with an accuracy rivaling the finest chronometers. I've had it divided into twenty–four hours like Italian clocks, since neither day nor night, sun nor moon, exist for me, but only this artificial light that I import into the depths of the seas! See, right now it's ten o'clock in the morning."

See also
 24-hour clock
 Direction finding watch
 Sector clock

References

Further reading
 
 

24-hour clocks and watches